Perspectives in Biology and Medicine is a peer-reviewed academic journal established in 1957. It publishes essays that explore biology and medicine in relation to their place in society. Authors write informally, presenting their "perspectives" as the title suggests. Topics covered are sometimes explicitly scientific, but might also extend into areas of philosophy, history, pedagogy, and medical practice. The journal is published quarterly by the Johns Hopkins University Press.

See also
 Medical humanities

References

External links
 

Publications established in 1957
General medical journals
Johns Hopkins University Press academic journals
English-language journals
Quarterly journals